The Royal Canadian Armoured Corps School is part of the Combat Training Centre located at CFB Gagetown, New Brunswick, and is responsible for the tactical and technical training for armoured non-commissioned members and officers, in addition to maintaining certain specialized qualifications on behalf of the Canadian Army. Non-commissioned members and officers alike are trained on the Leopard 2, Textron Tactical Armoured Patrol Vehicle, Coyote Reconnaissance Vehicle, and LAV VI armoured fighting vehicles.

Officer training 

Regular Force officer training used to be divided into two phases: Armour Troop Leader 1.1 (ATL 1.1) and Armour Troop Leader 1.2 (ATL 1.2). In ATL 1.1, students were taught about commanding a crew of a single vehicle on the Leopard 2 MBT. ATL 1.2 trained students as armoured reconnaissance troop leaders, using the LAV 6 and Textron Tactical Armoured Patrol Vehicle.

ATL was unified into a single course in September 2021, running 42 weeks long for Regular Force officers.

A 16 week course is taught to Reserve Force officers as ARTL (Reconnaissance) or ACTL (Cavalry).

References

Canadian Armed Forces
1940 establishments in New Brunswick
Canadian Armed Forces education and training establishments
Military education and training in Canada